Akurmi people (also Kurama), are an ethnic group in the Kaduna and Kano states who speak the T'kurmi language, an East Kainji language of Nigeria.

History
The Akurmi people, a friendly people who practice subsistence farming were said to have settled in Kaduna State about 600 years ago.

Religion
The Akurmi are reportedly predominantly Christian, numbering 88.0% (with Independents at 30.0%, Protestants 50.0% and Roman Catholics 20.0%). The remaining being adherents of Ethnic religion, 6.0% and Islam, 6.0%.

Kingship
The Akurmi are found in Akurmi (Kurama) Chiefdom in Lere Local Government Area. Their paramount ruler is called "B'gwam Kurmi" or Bagwama Akurmi. The current monarch, HRH Dr. Ishaku S. Damina, B'gwam Kurmi II was reportedly detained by the Kaduna State governor in 2017. They are also found in Saminaka Chiefdom in the same area.

References

Ethnic groups in Nigeria